Reginald H. "Reg" Foote (born c. 1892) was a rugby union player who represented Australia.

Foote, a wing, was born in Sydney and claimed a total of 3 international rugby caps for Australia.

References

Australian rugby union players
Australia international rugby union players
Rugby union players from Sydney
Rugby union wings